Securities and Exchange Board of India (Alternative Investment Funds) Regulations, 2012 (also called AIF Regulations) are a set of regulations introduced by Securities and Exchange Board of India (SEBI) in 2012, to regulate pooled investment funds in India, such as real estate, private equity and hedge funds.

Summary
These regulations apply to all pooled investment funds registered in India which received capital from Indian or foreign investors. These were made to regulated funds that were not covered under the SEBI (Mutual Funds) Regulations, 1996;  SEBI (Custodian Of Securities) Regulations, 1996 and any other regulations of SEBI. This was introduced to bring unregistered funds in India under the ambit of law. Prior to the introduction of this, many funds were operating in India that could not be classified as domestic venture capital funds (VCF), foreign venture capital investors (FVCI) or  foreign institutional investor (FII). After introduction of these regulations in July 2012, 123 entities registered themselves by November 2014.

The Alternative Investment Funds (AIFs) have been categorised into three classes:

 Category I: These funds receive incentives from the government. These include social venture funds, infrastructure funds, venture capital funds and SME funds.
 Category II: These funds are allowed to invest anywhere in any combination, but cannot take debts, except for day-to-day operation purposes. These include private equity funds and debt funds.
 Category III: Funds that make short-term investments and then sell, like hedge funds, come under this.

AIFs are usually marketed towards high net-worth persons. At any time, not more than 1000 investors are allowed.

In the 2015 Union budget of India, it was announced that foreign direct investments (FDI) would be allowed in AIFs. It was also announced that the tax liability will be shifted from the funds to the investors in Category I and Category II.

See also
 Securities Laws (Amendment) Bill, 2014, a law introduced in 2014 to check fraudulent funds

References

Further reading
 
 Regulatory Framework of Alternative Investment Fund (AIF) in India

Securities and Exchange Board of India
Indian business law